Buzara feneratrix  is a moth of the family Erebidae. It is found in Sundaland and Thailand.

References

External links
Species info

Calpinae
Moths described in 1852